Renunciates of Darkover is an anthology of fantasy and science fiction short stories edited by Marion Zimmer Bradley. The stories are set in Bradley's world of Darkover. The book was first published by DAW Books (No. 844) in March 1991.

Contents
 Introduction by Marion Zimmer Bradley
 "Strife" by Chel Avery
 "Amazon Fragment" (from the first draft of Thendara House) by Marion Zimmer Bradley
 "Broken Vows" by Annette Rodriguez
 "If Only Banshees Could See" by Janet R. Rhodes
 "A Midsummer Night's Gift" by Deborah Wheeler
 "The Honor of the Guild" by Joan Marie Verba
 "A Butterfly Season" by Diana L. Paxson
 "Misjudged Situations" by Kelly B. Jaggers
 "Awakening" by Mary Fenoglio
 "Carlina's Calling" by Patricia Duffy Novak
 "A Beginning" by Judith Kobylecky
 "Set a Thief" by Mercedes R. Lackey
 "Shut-in" by Jean Lamb
 "Danila's Song" by Vera Nazarian
 "A Proper Escort" by Elisabeth Waters
 "The Lesson in the Foothills" by Lynne Armstrong-Jones
 "Summer Fair" by Emily Alward
 "Varzil's Avengers" by Diann S. Partridge
 "To Touch a Comyn" by Andrew Rey
 "About Time" by Patricia B. Cirone
 "Family Visit" by Margaret L. Carter
 "Dalereuth Guild House" by Priscilla W. Armstrong

Sources
 
 
 
 

Darkover books
1991 anthologies
American anthologies
Fantasy anthologies
Works by Marion Zimmer Bradley
DAW Books books